The Australia cricket team are scheduled to tour South Africa in August 2023 to play five One Day International (ODI) and three Twenty20 International (T20I) matches. Originally, the tour was scheduled to take place in March 2021, to play three Test matches. Those matches would have formed part of the inaugural 2019–2021 ICC World Test Championship. However, in February 2021, that tour was postponed due to the COVID-19 pandemic.

Background
In December 2020, South Africa's One Day International (ODI) against England was postponed due to the COVID-19 pandemic. As a result, both cricket boards were looking at contingency plans for the Test series, including the possibility of playing the matches in Perth or the United Arab Emirates. An initial provisional start date for the tour of 18 February 2021 meant a tight turnaround from the end of South Africa's tour of Pakistan, although an update in January suggested the tour would begin in March 2021. Also in January 2021, Australia named their squad for the original tour dates.

On 27 January 2021, Cricket Australia named their squad for the tour, ahead of any confirmation of the dates of the fixtures. However, on 2 February 2021, Cricket Australia announced that the tour had been postponed due to the pandemic. As a result of the tour being postponed, New Zealand qualified for the final of the 2019–2021 ICC World Test Championship. In October 2021, Cricket Australia said that they were looking at a window in 2023 to play the white-ball matches.

ODI Series

1st ODI

2nd ODI

3rd ODI

4th ODI

5th ODI

T20I series

1st T20I

2nd T20I

3rd T20I

References

2023 in Australian cricket
2023 in South African cricket
International cricket competitions in 2023
2020-21
Cricket events postponed due to the COVID-19 pandemic